Events from the year 1985 in Iran.

Incumbents
 Supreme Leader: Ruhollah Khomeini 
 President: Ali Khamenei
 Prime Minister: Mir-Hossein Mousavi
 Chief Justice: Abdul-Karim Mousavi Ardebili

Events

Births
 20 April – Ehsan Jami, Dutch-Iranian activist and politician
 1 May – Saeed Kamali Dehghan.
 19 May – Hamed Haddadi.

See also
 Years in Iraq
 Years in Afghanistan

References

 
Iran
Years of the 20th century in Iran
1980s in Iran
Iran